Landsting may refer to:

 Thing (assembly), the supreme assembly of a land in Scandinavia, during Viking and Medieval times
 Parliament of Greenland
 Landsting (Denmark), one of the two houses of the Danish parliament between 1849 and 1953
 County councils of Sweden